Ethmia subsidiaris is a moth in the family Depressariidae. It was described by Edward Meyrick in 1935. It is found in Jiangsu, China.

References

Moths described in 1935
subsidiaris